Kira Tozer (born December 6, 1984) is a Canadian voice actress for cartoons, anime and video games. Her major roles include Minka Mark on Littlest Pet Shop and Kagome Higurashi in the 2012 anime, Inuyasha: The Final Act. She married in 2013.

Filmography

Animation

Anime

References

External links

1984 births
Actresses from Victoria, British Columbia
Canadian voice actresses
Living people
21st-century Canadian actresses